Lady Yeonchang of the Gyeongju Choi clan was the third wife of King Seongjong of Goryeo and the mother of Queen Wonhwa. 

She came from Gyeongju, Gyeongsang-do as the daughter of Confucianism Scholar Choi Haeng-eon and the Gyeongju Choi family never had marriage relationships with a Goryeo Royal member, so this marriage was unusual at that time. During King Seongjong's reign, he changed the past traditional political structure and actively introduced the Confucian political system to improve the national system. Around 1017, her son-in-law gave his 2nd wife's maternal families, the Gyeongju Choi clan royal titles and ranks, and Choi then known as Grand Lady of the Nakrang County.

In popular culture
Portrayed by Kim Yoon-hee in the 2009 KBS2 TV series Empress Cheonchu.

References

External links
Lady Yeonchang on Encykorea .

Royal consorts of the Goryeo Dynasty
10th-century Korean people
Year of birth unknown
Year of death unknown
People from Gyeongju